The 1951 St. Louis Browns season involved the Browns finishing 8th in the American League with a record of 52 wins, and 102 losses.

Regular season

Bill Veeck 
Bill Veeck, the majority owner and manager of St. Louis Browns, signed Satchel Paige July 17, 1951, and announced the 45-year-old would start the following night against the Washington Senators.  In his first game back in the major leagues since 1949, Paige pitched six innings of shutout baseball before giving up three runs in the 7th inning. Paige ended the season with a 3–4 record and a 4.79 ERA.

Another of Veeck's promotions included the signing of Eddie Gaedel. Gaedel gained immortality in the second game of a doubleheader on Sunday, August 19. He stood  shorter than Jon Rauch, whose height of  made him the tallest person to play in a major league game. He had been secretly signed by the Browns and put in uniform (complete with elf slippers & the number "⅛" on the back) as a publicity stunt.

Gaedel popped out of a papier-mache cake between games of a doubleheader to celebrate the American League's 50th anniversary, and as a Falstaff Brewery promotion. Falstaff, and the fans, had been promised a "festival of surprises" by Veeck. Before the second game got underway, the press agreed that the "midget-in-a-cake" appearance had not been up to Veeck's usual promotional standard. Falstaff personnel, who had been promised national publicity for their participation, were particularly dissatisfied. Keeping the surprise he had in store for the second game to himself, Veeck just meekly apologized.

Gaedel entered the game between the Browns and Detroit Tigers in the first inning as a pinch hitter for leadoff batter Frank Saucier. Immediately, umpire Ed Hurley called for Browns manager Zack Taylor. Veeck and Taylor had the foresight to have a copy of Gaedel's contract on hand, as well as a copy of the Browns' active roster, which had room for Gaedel's addition. Tigers pitcher Bob Cain walked him. Jim Delsing pinch ran for Gaedel, but did not score.

Ned Garver 
In 1951, Ned Garver fashioned an outstanding season. Pitching for the Browns, Garver compiled a 20–12 record, which was noteworthy considering the Browns lost 102 games. Garver also posted a 3.73 ERA. Garver's wins accounted for nearly 40 percent of the Browns' 52 total wins. Garver also led the American League in complete games with 24 in 1951, and when he pitched he often batted sixth in the order rather than the customary ninth, compiling a .305 batting average with one home run.

Garver is the only pitcher in American League history to win 20 or more games for a team which lost 100 or more games in the same season, and the only pitcher in Major League history to do since 1920 or with a winning record.

Season standings

Record vs. opponents

Notable transactions 
 June 4, 1951: Don Lenhardt was traded by the Browns to the Chicago White Sox for Kermit Wahl and Paul Lehner.
 July 14, 1951: Satchel Paige was signed as a free agent by the Browns.
 July 21, 1951: Bob Nieman was purchased by the Browns from the Oklahoma City Indians.
 July 31, 1951: Ray Coleman was selected off waivers from the Browns by the Chicago White Sox.
 August 19, 1951: Eddie Gaedel was signed as an amateur free agent by the Browns.

Roster

Player stats

Batting

Starters by position 
Note: Pos = Position; G = Games played; AB = At bats; H = Hits; Avg. = Batting average; HR = Home runs; RBI = Runs batted in

Other batters 
Note: G = Games played; AB = At bats; H = Hits; Avg. = Batting average; HR = Home runs; RBI = Runs batted in

Pitching

Starting pitchers 
Note: G = Games pitched; IP = Innings pitched; W = Wins; L = Losses; ERA = Earned run average; SO = Strikeouts

Other pitchers 
Note: G = Games pitched; IP = Innings pitched; W = Wins; L = Losses; ERA = Earned run average; SO = Strikeouts

Relief pitchers 
Note: G = Games pitched; W = Wins; L = Losses; SV = Saves; ERA = Earned run average; SO = Strikeouts

Farm system 

LEAGUE CHAMPIONS: Dayton

References

External links
1951 St. Louis Browns team at Baseball-Reference
1951 St. Louis Browns season at baseball-almanac.com

St. Louis Browns seasons
Saint Louis Browns season
St Louis Browns